Lemmon is a town in Perkins County, South Dakota, United States. The population was 1,160 at the 2020 census.

Lemmon is named after George Ed Lemmon, a cattleman, who founded the town in 1906.

The City of Lemmon received the South Dakota Community of the Year Award in 2012.

Geography
Lemmon is located at  (45.939375, -102.160128).

Lemmon's north border is the Adams County, North Dakota, boundary. To the east of Lemmon is Corson County and Standing Rock Indian Reservation.

History
Lemmon's history as a town started in 1902 with the U.S. government's forced leasing of about 800,000 acres of Standing Rock Indian Reservation lands to cattle rancher George Ed Lemmon.

In 1919, Lemmon became a sundown town, prohibiting African Americans from living there.

Demographics

2010 census
As of the census of 2010,  1,227 people, 567 households, and 319 families resided in the city. The 732 housing units averaged . The racial makeup of the city was 96.3% White, 0.1% African American, 1.9% Native American, 0.2% Asian, 0.1% from other races, and 1.5% from two or more races. Hispanics or Latinos of any race were 0.7% of the population.

Of the 567 households, 20.8% had children under the age of 18 living with them, 46.7% were married couples living together, 6.9% had a female householder with no husband present, 2.6% had a male householder with no wife present, and 43.7% were not families. About 39.5% of all households were made up of individuals, and 20.7% had someone living alone who was 65 years of age or older. The average household size was 2.05 and the average family size was 2.73.

The median age in the city was 50.8 years; 17.4% of residents were under the age of 18; 5.4% were between the ages of 18 and 24; 18.3% were from 25 to 44; 31.2% were from 45 to 64; and 27.6% were 65 years of age or older. The gender makeup of the city was 47.6% male and 52.4% female.

2000 census
As of the census of 2000, 1,398 people, 623 households, and 356 families resided in the city. The population density was 1,378.7 people per square mile (534.4/km). The 776 housing units  averaged 765.3 per square mile (296.6/km). The racial makeup of the city was 95.99% White, 0.14% African American, 2.65% Native American, 0.36% Asian, 0.29% from other races, and 0.57% from two or more races. Hispanics or Latinos of any race were 0.50% of the population.

Of the 623 households, 25.2% had children under the age of 18 living with them, 47.5% were married couples living together, 7.9% had a female householder with no husband present, and 42.7% were not families. Around 40.3% of all households were made up of individuals, and 22.2% had someone living alone who was 65 years of age or older. The average household size was 2.15 and the average family size was 2.91.

In the city, the population was distributed as 22.9% under the age of 18, 6.3% from 18 to 24, 24.7% from 25 to 44, 18.7% from 45 to 64, and 27.5% who were 65 years of age or older. The median age was 42 years. For every 100 females, there were 84.2 males. For every 100 females age 18 and over, there were 81.2 males.

As of 2000, the median income for a household in the city was $28,109, and for a family was $37,813. Males had a median income of $27,426 versus $17,813 for females. The per capita income for the city was $17,272. About 8.0% of families and 12.0% of the population were below the poverty line, including 12.1% of those under age 18 and 16.0% of those age 65 or over.

Climate
Lemmon has a relatively dry humid continental climate (Köppen Dwa/Dwb) characterized by very warm to hot summers with cool mornings, and freezing, dry, although extremely variable winters.

Arts and culture

The city contains the Lemmon Petrified Park, the home of the world's largest petrified-wood park. This tourist attraction fills an entire block of the downtown area and is built entirely of petrified wood, fossils, and stone. Construction began in 1930 and continued until 1932 under the supervision of Ole S. Quammen. It was in private ownership until 1954, when it was donated to the city by Quammen's heirs. The park features a wishing well, a waterfall, and a castle.  The castle weighs 300 tons and boasts towering spires and turrets.  Also in the park are two separate museums, both built entirely of petrified wood. The larger of the two is circular has a petrified grass floor along with petrified logs. Dinosaur claws, bird tracks, and fossilized snakes can be seen in the petrified wood. Also in the museum are antiques and artifacts from the Lemmon area. The formations in the park number over 100 and are up to 20 ft tall.

The Boss Cowman Rodeo and Celebration is the second weekend in July, and is one of the largest rodeos in the state.

The Grand River Museum is located on Highway 12.  The museum features exhibits on creation science, fossils, Native Americans, cowboys and ranch life, a full-scale tipi, and a model of the Ark.  Admission is free.

The Kokomo, located on Main Street, is the home of sculptor John Lopez's art gallery.

Lemmon has a 9-hole golf course, an airport, two convenience stores, 
a hardware store, a grocery store, an American Legion, and many other businesses.  Lemmon also has seven churches, three financial institutions, a library, a movie theater, a clinic, and nursing home.  Three motels are in town.  The Lemmon Sale Barn is just to the west of town, with sales every Wednesday.

Many Lemmonites are employed at Wheeler Manufacturing, which produces jewelry products.  Gregorian, Inc. and Dakota Woodcrafts also employ manufacturing workers.  Other major employers are the school system and ranches.

Government
The mayor of Lemmon is Neal Pinnow, who was elected in April 2008 to replace outgoing mayor Wally Dauwen.  The city council has eight members.  The Lemmon Police Department was absorbed by the Perkins County Sheriffs Department, and now has three deputies, along with a SD highway patrolman stationed in Lemmon and a 30-man volunteer fire department. Lemmon is the site of the Grand River National Grassland and Cedar River National Grassland Ranger District office.

Education
Lemmon's school district includes a high school and an elementary school.  The Progress country school operated in Meadow until the summer of 2010, when it was destroyed by a tornado.  The small rural school district was then consolidated into the Lemmon and Faith districts.

Local media

AM radio

Notable person
 Kathleen Norris, poet

See also
 North Lemmon, North Dakota

References

Cities in South Dakota
Cities in Perkins County, South Dakota
1908 establishments in South Dakota
Sundown towns in the United States